Espérance Sportive de Guelma, known as ES Guelma or simply ESG for short, is an Algerian football club based in Guelma.  The club was founded in 1924 as 'Espérance Sportive Franco Musulmane Guelmoise (ESFM Guelmoise)' and its colours are black and white. Their home stadium, Stade Souidani Boujemaa, has a capacity of 15,000 spectators. The club is currently playing in the Inter-Régions Division.

The club spent 17 seasons in the Algerian Championnat National, with the last time being in 1992. The club also reached the semi-finals of the Algerian Cup on three occasions: 1968, 1987 and 1989.

Honours

National
Championship of East League of Constantine (Honour Division)
Champion (3 times): 1952, 1954, 1955
Algerian Championship
Runner-up (1 time): 1966

International
North African Championship
Winner (1 time): 1955

References

Football clubs in Algeria
Association football clubs established in 1924
1924 establishments in Algeria